Pontibacter amylolyticus  is a Gram-negative and short rod-shaped bacterium from the genus of Pontibacter which has been isolated from sediments from a hydrothermal vent field from the Indian Ridge.

References

External links
Type strain of Pontibacter amylolyticus at BacDive -  the Bacterial Diversity Metadatabase

Cytophagia
Bacteria described in 2016